In Yemen, popular committees are armed groups formed by Yemeni tribes on behalf of more professional armed forces.

Overview
The Yemeni army has required the support of tribal militias or what have become known as People's Committees in internal and external wars. When the 1963 revolution in northern Yemen did not receive military support from the United Kingdom, some troops allied with the deposed imams to regain power. Tribal links weakened, especially in Taiz and Ibb; members received a monthly salary, wore military uniforms and underwent military training.

During the presidency of Abdul Rahman al-Iryani (1967–1974) the military battled over policy, beginning with a conflict over the establishment of the National Council. The popular committees further polarized the country.

During the 1980s Ali Abdullah Saleh reemphasized tribal affairs, in contrast with assassinated president Ibrahim al-Hamdi. His government clashed with the Houthis in Saada and 'Amran Governorates from 2004 to 2009, and the popular committees were used to a regional al-Qaeda's insurgency.

In course of the Yemeni Revolution, more and more self-defense groups or popular committees sprung up around the country. One of these was led by warlord Abdullatif Al-Sayed who initially fought against President Saleh's government and with al-Qaeda in the Arabian Peninsula (AQAP), but later sided with the new government of Abdrabbuh Mansur Hadi. He reorganized his forces as auxiliaries for the army and supported Hadi in the later Yemeni Civil War. By 2015, popular committees had spread to other provinces of Yemen, and played a major role in the Battle of Aden (2015) against the Houthis.

By 2018, the Houthi rebels had also started to organize their own "popular committees".

See also

Abdrabbuh Mansur Hadi

References

Organizations of the Yemeni Crisis (2011–present)
Paramilitary organizations based in Yemen
Yemeni Civil War (2014–present)